Skupień is a Polish family name and in Wikipedia may refer to:

Mitch Skupien, manager and executive in the All-American Girls Professional Baseball League.
Wojciech Skupień (born 1976), Polish ski jumper
Zdzisław Skupień (born 1938), Polish mathematician

Polish-language surnames